Irina Tebenikhina (born 5 December 1978 in Fergana) is a volleyball player from Russia, who represented her native country at the 2004 Summer Olympics in Athens, Greece. There she won the silver medal with the Women's National Team, for which she made her debut in 1997.

Honours
 1997 FIVB World Grand Prix — 1st place
 1997 European Championship — 1st place
 1998 World Championship — 3rd place
 1998 FIVB World Grand Prix — 2nd place
 1999 FIVB World Grand Prix — 1st place
 2003 FIVB World Grand Prix — 2nd place
 2004 Olympic Games — 2nd place

References
 Profile

1978 births
Living people
Russian women's volleyball players
Volleyball players at the 2004 Summer Olympics
Olympic volleyball players of Russia
Olympic silver medalists for Russia
People from Fergana
Olympic medalists in volleyball
Medalists at the 2004 Summer Olympics
20th-century Russian women
21st-century Russian women